Serhii Plokhy, or Plokhii (born 23 May 1957) is the Mykhailo Hrushevsky professor of Ukrainian history at Harvard University, where he also serves as the director of the Harvard Ukrainian Research Institute.

Personal background 
Serhii Plokhy was born in Nizhnii Novgorod, Russia. He spent his childhood and school years in Zaporizhzhia, Ukraine, where his family returned soon after his birth.

Educational background 
Plokhy received his undergraduate degree in history and social sciences from the
University of Dnipropetrovsk (1980), where he studied under professors Mykola Kovalskyi and Yuriy Mytsyk, and his graduate degree from the Russian University
of the Friendship of Peoples (1982), specializing in historiography
and source studies. He received his habilitation degree in history
from Taras Shevchenko National University of Kyiv in 1990.

Professional background 
Between 1983 and 1991, Plokhy taught at the University of Dnipropetrovsk, where he was promoted to the rank of full professor and held a number of administrative positions during perestroika. In 1996, after a number of visiting appointments as the Ramsey Tompkins Professor of Russian history at the University of Alberta, Plokhy joined the staff of the university's Canadian Institute of Ukrainian Studies, where he founded the Research Program on Religion and Culture. As part of the Peter Jacyk Center for Ukrainian Historical Research, he participated in the publication of the English-language translation of Mykhailo Hrushevsky's History of Ukraine-Rus.

In 2007, Plokhy was named the Mykhailo Hrushevsky professor of Ukrainian history at Harvard. Since 2013, he has served as the director of the Harvard Ukrainian Research Institute, where he leads a group of scholars working on MAPA: The Digital Atlas of Ukraine, an online, GIS-based project.

Plokhy's research and writing deal with the intellectual, cultural, and international history of Eastern Europe, with special emphasis on Ukraine. His first monograph, The Papacy and Ukraine, was among the few books published in the Soviet Union to deal with the history of the papacy as an academic subject rather than an object of atheistic propaganda. Among Plokhy's best known contributions to the study of early modern history is The Origins of the Slavic Nations, a broad survey of the history of the region which rejects primordialist ideas that postulate the existence of either one or three—Russian, Ukrainian, and Belarusian—East Slavic nationalities before the rise of nationalism. Instead, it proposes an alternative scheme of the development of pre-modern identities of the Eastern Slavs.

Plokhy's research on the history of the Cold War era resulted in the publication of Yalta: The Price of Peace and The Last Empire, where Plokhy challenged the interpretation of the collapse of the Soviet Union as an American victory in the Cold War, instead arguing Ukraine and Russia were the two republics responsible for the end of the Soviet Union.

Honors and awards 
Plokhy’s
books have been translated into a number of languages, including Albanian, Belarusian, Chinese (classic and simplified), Estonian, Greek, Finnish, Italian, Korean, Lithuanian, Polish, Portuguese, Romanian,
Russian, Spanish, and Ukrainian, and won numerous awards and prizes.

The Last Empire: The Final Days of the Soviet Union won the 2015 Lionel Gelber Prize
for the world's best non-fiction book in English on global issues and the 2015
Pushkin House (London, UK) Russian Book Prize. Chernobyl won the 2018 Baillie Gifford Prize (formerly the Samuel Johnson Prize). Much of Plohky's evidence in the book comes from published sources, but "he tells the story with great assurance and style, and the majority of his material appears here for the first time in English," wrote Tobie Mathew in Literary Review.

In 2009, Plokhy received the Early
Slavic Studies Association Distinguished Scholarship Award, and in 2013 he was
named the Walter Channing Cabot Fellow at the Faculty of Arts and Sciences of
Harvard University for scholarly eminence in the field of history. In 2015 Serhii Plokhy received the Antonovych prize, and in 2018 the Shevchenko National Prize (Ukraine).

Published works 
 Plokhy, Serhii. The Cossacks and Religion in Early Modern Ukraine, Oxford University Press, 2002. 
 Plokhy, Serhii. Tsars and Cossacks: A Study in Iconography, Ukrainian Research Institute, Harvard University, 2003. 
 Plokhy, Serhii and Frank E. Sysyn. Religion and Nation in Modern Ukraine, Canadian Institute of Ukrainian Studies, 2003. 
 Plokhy, Serhii. Unmaking Imperial Russia: Mykhailo Hrushevsky and the Writing of Ukrainian History, University of Toronto Press, 2005. 
 Plokhy, Serhii. The Origins of the Slavic Nations: Premodern Identities in Russia, Ukraine and Belarus, Cambridge University Press, 2006. 
 Plokhy, Serhii. Ukraine and Russia: Representations of the Past , University of Toronto Press, 2008. 
 Plokhy, Serhii. Yalta: The Price of Peace, Viking Adult, 2010. 
 Plokhy, Serhii. The Cossack Myth: History and Nationhood in the Age of Empires, Cambridge University Press, 2012. 
 Plokhy, Serhii. The Last Empire: The Final Days of the Soviet Union. New York: Basic Books, 2014. 520 pp. $32.00 (cloth), .
 Plokhy, Serhii. The Gates of Europe: A History of Ukraine. New York: Basic Books, 2015. — 395 pp., .
 Plokhy, Serhii. Lost Kingdom: The Quest for Empire and the Making of the Russian Nation. New York: Basic Books, 2017. — 398 pp., .
 Plokhy, Serhii. Chernobyl: History of a Tragedy, London: Allen Lane, 2018.
 Plokhy, Serhii. Forgotten Bastards of the Eastern Front. Oxford: Oxford University Press, 2019. 369 p. 
 Plokhy, Serhii. Nuclear Folly: A History of the Cuban Missile Crisis, New York: W. W. Norton & Company, 2021. 
 Plokhy, Serhii, The Frontline: Essays on Ukraine's Past and Present, Cambridge, MA: Ukrainian Research Institute, Harvard University, 2021. 
 Plokhy, Serhii. Atoms and Ashes: A Global History of Nuclear Disaster, New York: W. W. Norton & Company, 2022.

See also 
 Bibliography of Ukrainian history

References

External links 

 Serhii Plokhii at Harvard Ukrainian Research Institute
 Plokhii, Serhii. Ukraine or Little Russia? Revisiting the Early Nineteenth Century Debate, Cambridge, 2008.

Notes 

1957 births
Living people
20th-century Ukrainian historians
Historians of Ukraine
Oles Honchar Dnipro National University alumni
Peoples' Friendship University of Russia alumni
21st-century Ukrainian historians
Harvard University faculty